Family Blood is a 2018 American horror film directed by Sonny Mallhi and written by Nick Savvides and Mallhi. It stars Vinessa Shaw, James Ransone, Colin Ford, Ajiona Alexus, Carson Meyer, France Jean-Baptiste and Eloise Lushina.

Blumhouse Productions, Divide/Conquer and Gunpowder & Sky released the film on May 4, 2018 via Netflix.

Plot 
Ellie, a recovering drug addict, has just moved to a new city with her two teenage children. She has struggled to stay sober in the past and is determined to make it work this time, finding a stable job and regularly attending her meetings. Unfortunately, new friends, a new job, and the chance of a new life, can't keep Ellie from slipping once again. Her life changes when she meets Christopher - a different kind of addict - which forces her daughter and son to accept a new version of Ellie.

Cast 
 Vinessa Shaw as Ellie
 James Ransone as Christopher 
 Colin Ford as Kyle
 Ajiona Alexus as Meegan
 Carson Meyer as Kristen
 France Jean-Baptiste as Mrs. Jensen
 Eloise Lushina as Amy

Production
Principal photography on the film began in October 2016 in Louisville, Kentucky.

References

External links 
 
 

2018 horror films
2018 horror thriller films
American horror thriller films
American teen horror films
American thriller drama films
American horror drama films
American vampire films
Blumhouse Productions films
2010s English-language films
2010s American films